

Events

Pre-1600
 224 – The Battle of Hormozdgan is fought. Ardashir I defeats and kills Artabanus V effectively ending the Parthian Empire.
 357 – Emperor Constantius II enters Rome for the first time to celebrate his victory over Magnus Magnentius.
1192 – Assassination of Conrad of Montferrat (Conrad I), King of Jerusalem, in Tyre, two days after his title to the throne is confirmed by election. The killing is carried out by Hashshashin.
1253 – Nichiren, a Japanese Buddhist monk, propounds Namu Myōhō Renge Kyō for the very first time and declares it to be the essence of Buddhism, in effect founding Nichiren Buddhism.
1294 – Temür, grandson of Kublai, is elected Khagan of the Mongols with the reigning title Oljeitu.
1503 – The Battle of Cerignola is fought. It is noted as one of the first European battles in history won by small arms fire using gunpowder.

1601–1900
1611 – Establishment of the Pontifical and Royal University of Santo Tomas, The Catholic University of the Philippines, the largest Catholic university in the world.
1625 – A combined Spanish and Portuguese fleet of 52 ships commences the recapture of Bahia from the Dutch during the Dutch–Portuguese War.
1758 – The Marathas defeat the Afghans in the Battle of Attock and capture the city.
1788 – Maryland becomes the seventh state to ratify the United States Constitution.
1789 – Mutiny on the Bounty: Lieutenant William Bligh and 18 sailors are set adrift and the rebel crew returns to Tahiti briefly and then sets sail for Pitcairn Island.
1792 – France invades the Austrian Netherlands (present day Belgium and Luxembourg), beginning the French Revolutionary Wars.
1794 – Sardinians, headed by Giovanni Maria Angioy, start a revolution against the Savoy domination, expelling Viceroy Balbiano and his officials from Cagliari, the capital and largest city of the island.
1796 – The Armistice of Cherasco is signed by Napoleon Bonaparte and Vittorio Amedeo III, King of Sardinia, expanding French territory along the Mediterranean coast.
1869 – Chinese and Irish laborers for the Central Pacific Railroad working on the First transcontinental railroad lay ten miles of track in one day, a feat which has never been matched.
1881 – Billy the Kid escapes from the Lincoln County jail in Mesilla, New Mexico.
1887 – A week after being arrested by the Prussian Secret Police, French police inspector Guillaume Schnaebelé is released on order of William I, German Emperor, defusing a possible war.

1901–present
1910 – Frenchman Louis Paulhan wins the 1910 London to Manchester air race, the first long-distance aeroplane race in the United Kingdom.
1920 – The Azerbaijan Soviet Socialist Republic is founded.
1923 – Wembley Stadium is opened, named initially as the Empire Stadium.
1930 – The Independence Producers hosted the first night game in the history of Organized Baseball in Independence, Kansas. 
1941 – The Ustaše massacre nearly 200 Serbs in the village of Gudovac, the first massacre of their genocidal campaign against Serbs of the Independent State of Croatia.
1944 – World War II: Nine German E-boats attacked US and UK units during Exercise Tiger, the rehearsal for the Normandy landings, killing 946.
1945 – Benito Mussolini and his mistress Clara Petacci are shot dead by Walter Audisio, a member of the Italian resistance movement.
  1945   – The Holocaust: Nazi Germany carries out its final use of gas chambers to execute 33 Upper Austrian socialist and communist leaders in Mauthausen concentration camp. 
1947 – Thor Heyerdahl and five crew mates set out from Peru on the Kon-Tiki to demonstrate that Peruvian natives could have settled Polynesia.
1948 – Igor Stravinsky conducted the premiere of his American ballet, Orpheus at the New York City Center.
1949 – The Hukbalahap are accused of assassinating former First Lady of the Philippines Aurora Quezon, while she is en route to dedicate a hospital in memory of her late husband; her daughter and ten others are also killed.
1952 – Dwight D. Eisenhower resigns as Supreme Allied Commander of NATO in order to campaign in the 1952 United States presidential election.
  1952   – The Treaty of San Francisco comes into effect, restoring Japanese sovereignty and ending its state of war with most of the Allies of World War II.
  1952   – The Sino-Japanese Peace Treaty (Treaty of Taipei) is signed in Taipei, Taiwan between Japan and the Republic of China to officially end the Second Sino-Japanese War.
1965 – United States occupation of the Dominican Republic: American troops land in the Dominican Republic to "forestall establishment of a Communist dictatorship" and to evacuate U.S. Army troops.
1967 – Vietnam War: Boxer Muhammad Ali refuses his induction into the United States Army and is subsequently stripped of his championship and license.
1969 – Charles de Gaulle resigns as President of France.
1970 – Vietnam War: U.S. President Richard Nixon formally authorizes American combat troops to take part in the Cambodian campaign.
1973 – The Dark Side of the Moon by Pink Floyd, recorded in Abbey Road Studios goes to number one on the US Billboard chart, beginning a record-breaking 741-week chart run.
1975 – General Cao Văn Viên, chief of the South Vietnamese military, departs for the US as the North Vietnamese Army closes in on victory.
1977 – The Red Army Faction trial ends, with Andreas Baader, Gudrun Ensslin and Jan-Carl Raspe found guilty of four counts of murder and more than 30 counts of attempted murder.
1978 – The President of Afghanistan, Mohammed Daoud Khan, is overthrown and assassinated in a coup led by pro-communist rebels.
  1986   – High levels of radiation resulting from the Chernobyl disaster are detected at a nuclear power plant in Sweden, leading Soviet authorities to publicly announce the accident.
1988 – Near Maui, Hawaii, flight attendant Clarabelle "C.B." Lansing is blown out of Aloha Airlines Flight 243, a Boeing 737, and falls to her death when part of the plane's fuselage rips open in mid-flight.
1994 – Former Central Intelligence Agency counterintelligence officer and analyst Aldrich Ames pleads guilty to giving U.S. secrets to the Soviet Union and later Russia.
1996 – Whitewater controversy: President Bill Clinton gives a 4 hour videotaped testimony for the defense.
  1996   – Port Arthur massacre, Tasmania: A gunman, Martin Bryant, opens fire at the Broad Arrow Cafe in Port Arthur, Tasmania, killing 35 people and wounding 23 others.
2004 – CBS News released evidence of the Abu Ghraib torture and prisoner abuse. The photographs show rape and abuse from the American troops over Iraqi detainees.

Births

Pre-1600
AD 32 – Otho, Roman emperor (d. 69 AD)
1402 – Nezahualcoyotl, Acolhuan philosopher, warrior, poet and ruler (d. 1472)
1442 – Edward IV, king of England (d. 1483)
1545 – Yi Sun-sin, Korean commander (d. 1598)
1573 – Charles de Valois, Duke of Angoulême, son of Charles IX (d. 1650)

1601–1900
1604 – Joris Jansen Rapelje, Dutch settler in colonial North America (d. 1662)
1623 – Wilhelmus Beekman, Dutch politician (d. 1707)
1630 – Charles Cotton, English poet and author (d. 1687)
1676 – Frederick I, prince consort and king of Sweden (d. 1751)
1715 – Franz Sparry, Austrian composer and educator (d. 1767)
1758 – James Monroe, American soldier, lawyer, and politician, 5th President of the United States (d. 1831)
1761 – Marie Harel, French cheesemaker (d. 1844)
1765 – Sylvestre François Lacroix, French mathematician and academic (d. 1834)
1819 – Ezra Abbot, American scholar and academic (d. 1884)
1827 – William Hall, Canadian soldier, Victoria Cross recipient (d. 1904)
1838 – Tobias Asser, Dutch lawyer and scholar, Nobel Prize laureate (d. 1913)
1848 – Ludvig Schytte, Danish pianist, composer, and educator (d. 1909)
1854 – Hertha Marks Ayrton, Polish-British engineer, mathematician, and physicist. (d. 1923)
1855 – José Malhoa, Portuguese painter (d. 1933)
1863 – Josiah Thomas, English-Australian miner and politician, 7th Australian Minister for Foreign Affairs (d. 1933)
  1863   – Nikolai von Meck, Russian engineer (d. 1929) 
1865 – Charles W. Woodworth, American entomologist and academic (d. 1940)
1868 – Lucy Booth, English composer (d. 1953)
  1868   – Georgy Voronoy, Ukrainian-Russian mathematician and academic (d. 1908)
1874 – Karl Kraus, Austrian journalist and author (d. 1936)
  1874   – Sidney Toler, American actor and director (d. 1947)
1876 – Nicola Romeo, Italian engineer and businessman (d. 1938)
1878 – Lionel Barrymore, American actor and director (d. 1954)
1886 – Erich Salomon, German-born news photographer (d. 1944)
  1886   – Art Shaw, American hurdler (d. 1955)
1888 – Walter Tull, English footballer and soldier (d. 1918)
1889 – António de Oliveira Salazar, Portuguese economist and politician, 100th Prime Minister of Portugal (d. 1970)
1896 – Na Hye-sok, South Korean journalist, poet, and painter (d. 1948)
  1896   – Tristan Tzara, Romanian-French poet and critic (d. 1963)
1897 – Ye Jianying, Chinese general and politician, Head of State of the People's Republic of China (d. 1986)
1900 – Alice Berry, Australian activist (d. 1978) 
  1900   – Heinrich Müller, German SS officer (d. 1945)
  1900   – Jan Oort, Dutch astronomer and academic (d. 1992)

1901–present
1901 – H. B. Stallard, English runner and surgeon (d. 1973)
1902 – Johan Borgen, Norwegian author and critic (d. 1979)
1906 – Kurt Gödel, Czech-American mathematician, philosopher, and academic (d. 1978)
  1906   – Paul Sacher, Swiss conductor and philanthropist (d. 1999)
1908 – Ethel Catherwood, American-Canadian high jumper and javelin thrower (d. 1987)
  1908   – Jack Fingleton, Australian cricketer, journalist, and sportscaster (d. 1981)
  1908   – Oskar Schindler, Czech-German businessman (d. 1974)
1909 – Arthur Võõbus, Estonian-American theologist and orientalist (d. 1988)
1910 – Sam Merwin, Jr., American author (d. 1996)
1911 – Lee Falk, American director, producer, and playwright (d. 1999)
1912 – Odette Hallowes, French soldier and spy (d. 1995)
  1912   – Kaneto Shindō, Japanese director, producer, and screenwriter (d. 2012)
1913 – Rose Murphy, American singer (d. 1989)
1914 – Michel Mohrt, French author, historian (d. 2011)
1916 – Ferruccio Lamborghini, Italian businessman, created Lamborghini (d. 1993)
1917 – Robert Cornthwaite, American actor (d. 2006)
1921 – Rowland Evans, American soldier, journalist, and author (d. 2001)
  1921   – Simin Daneshvar, Iranian author and academic (d. 2012)
1923 – Carolyn Cassady, American author (d. 2013)
  1923   – William Guarnere, American sergeant (d. 2014)
1924 – Dick Ayers, American author and illustrator (d. 2014)
  1924   – Blossom Dearie, American singer and pianist (d. 2009)
  1924   – Kenneth Kaunda, Zambian educator and politician, first president of Zambia (d. 2021)
1925 – T. John Lesinski, American judge and politician, 51st Lieutenant Governor of Michigan (d. 1996)
  1925   – John Leonard Thorn, English lieutenant, author, and academic
1926 – James Bama, American artist and illustrator
  1926   – Bill Blackbeard, American historian and author (d. 2011)
  1926   – Harper Lee, American novelist (d. 2016)
  1926   – Hulusi Sayın, Turkish general (d. 1991)
1928 – Yves Klein, French painter (d. 1962)
  1928   – Eugene Merle Shoemaker, American geologist and astronomer (d. 1997)
1930 – James Baker, American lawyer and politician, 61st United States Secretary of State
  1930   – Carolyn Jones, American actress (d. 1983)
1933 – Miodrag Radulovacki, Serbian-American neuropharmacologist and academic (d. 2014)
1934 – Lois Duncan, American journalist and author (d. 2016)
1935 – Pedro Ramos, Cuban baseball player
  1935   – Jimmy Wray, Scottish boxer and politician (d. 2013)
1936 – Tariq Aziz, Iraqi journalist and politician, Iraqi Minister of Foreign Affairs (d. 2015)
1937 – Saddam Hussein, Iraqi general and politician, 5th President of Iraq (d. 2006)
  1937   – Jean Redpath, Scottish singer-songwriter (d. 2014)
  1937   – John White, Scottish international footballer (d. 1964)
1938 – Madge Sinclair, Jamaican-American actress (d. 1995)
1941 – Ann-Margret, Swedish-American actress, singer, and dancer
  1941   – Lucien Aimar, French cyclist
  1941   – John Madejski, English businessman and academic
  1941   – Karl Barry Sharpless, American chemist and academic, Nobel Prize laureate
  1941   – Iryna Zhylenko, Ukrainian poet and author (d. 2013)
1942 – Mike Brearley, English cricketer and psychoanalyst
1943 – Aryeh Bibi, Iraqi-born Israeli politician
1944 – Elizabeth LeCompte, American director and producer
  1944   – Jean-Claude Van Cauwenberghe, Belgian politician, 10th Minister-President of Wallonia
  1944   – Alice Waters, American chef and author
1946 – Nour El-Sherif, Egyptian actor and producer (d. 2015)
  1946   – Ginette Reno, Canadian singer-songwriter and actress
  1946   – Larissa Grunig, American theorist and activist
1947 – Christian Jacq, French historian and author 
  1947   – Nicola LeFanu, English composer and academic
  1947   – Steve Khan, American jazz guitarist
1948 – Terry Pratchett, English journalist, author, and screenwriter (d. 2015)
  1948   – Marcia Strassman, American actress and singer (d. 2014)
1949 – Jeremy Cooke, English lawyer and judge
  1949   – Paul Guilfoyle, American actor
  1949   – Bruno Kirby, American actor and director (d. 2006)
1950 – Willie Colón, Puerto Rican-American trombonist and producer 
  1950   – Jay Leno, American comedian, talk show host, and producer
  1950   – Steve Rider, English journalist and sportscaster
1951 – Tim Congdon, English economist and politician
  1951   – Larry Smith, Canadian football player and politician
1952 – Chuck Leavell, American singer-songwriter and keyboard player 
  1952   – Mary McDonnell, American actress
1953 – Roberto Bolaño, Chilean novelist, short-story writer, poet, and essayist (d. 2003)
  1953   – Kim Gordon, American singer-songwriter, guitarist, and producer
  1953   – Brian Greenhoff, English footballer and coach (d. 2013)
1954 – Timothy Curley, American educator
  1954   – Michael P. Jackson, American politician, 3rd Deputy Secretary of Homeland Security
  1954   – Vic Sotto, Filipino actor-producer, singer-songwriter, comedian and television personality
  1954   – Ron Zook, American football player and coach
1955 – Saeb Erekat, Chief Palestinian negotiator (d. 2020)
  1955   – Eddie Jobson, English keyboard player and violinist 
  1955   – Dieter Rubach, German bass player
1956 – Jimmy Barnes, Scottish-Australian singer-songwriter and guitarist
1957 – Wilma Landkroon, Dutch singer
1958 – Hal Sutton, American golfer
1960 – Tom Browning, American baseball player
  1960   – Elena Kagan, American lawyer and jurist, Associate Justice of the Supreme Court of the United States
  1960   – Phil King, English bass player 
  1960   – Ian Rankin, Scottish author
  1960   – Jón Páll Sigmarsson, Icelandic strongman and weightlifter (d. 1993)
  1960   – Walter Zenga, Italian footballer and manager 
1963 – Sandrine Dumas, French actress, director, and screenwriter
  1963   – Lloyd Eisler, Canadian figure skater and coach
  1963   – Marc Lacroix, Belgian biochemist and academic
1964 – Stephen Ames, Trinidadian golfer
  1964   – Noriyuki Iwadare, Japanese composer
  1964   – Ajay Kakkar, Baron Kakkar, English surgeon and academic
  1964   – Barry Larkin, American baseball player, manager, and sportscaster
  1964   – L'Wren Scott, American model and fashion designer (d. 2014)
1965 – Jennifer Rardin, American author (d. 2010)
1966 – John Daly, American golfer
  1966   – Too Short, American rapper, producer and actor
1967 – Chris White, English engineer and politician
1968 – Howard Donald, English singer-songwriter and producer 
  1968   – Andy Flower, South-African-Zimbabwean cricketer and coach
1969 – LeRon Perry Ellis, American basketball player 
1970 – Richard Fromberg, Australian tennis player
  1970   – Nicklas Lidström, Swedish ice hockey player and scout
  1970   – Diego Simeone, Argentinian footballer and manager
1971 – Brad McEwan, Australian journalist
1972 – Violent J, American rapper
  1972   – Helena Tulve, Estonian composer
  1972   – Jean-Paul van Gastel, Dutch footballer and manager
1973 – Jorge Garcia, American actor and producer
  1973   – Earl Holmes, American football player and coach
  1973   – Andrew Mehrtens, South African-New Zealand rugby player
1974 – Penélope Cruz, Spanish actress and producer
  1974   – Margo Dydek, Polish basketball player and coach (d. 2011)
  1974   – Richel Hersisia, Dutch boxer
  1974   – Vernon Kay, English radio and television host
  1974   – Dominic Matteo, Scottish footballer and journalist
1975 – Michael Walchhofer, Austrian skier
1976 – Shane Jurgensen, Australian cricketer 
1978 – Lauren Laverne, English singer and television host
  1978   – Robert Oliveri, American actor
  1978   – Nate Richert, American actor
1979 – Scott Fujita, American football player and sportscaster
1980 – Bradley Wiggins, English cyclist
1981 – Jessica Alba, American model and actress
  1981   – Pietro Travagli, Italian rugby player
1982 – Nikki Grahame, English model and journalist (d. 2021)
  1982   – Chris Kaman, American basketball player
1983 – Josh Brookes, Australian motorcycle racer
  1983   – David Freese, American baseball player
  1983   – Roger Johnson, English footballer
  1983   – Graham Wagg, English cricketer
  1983   – Thomas Waldrom, New Zealand-English rugby player
1984 – Dmitri Torbinski, Russian footballer
1985 – Lucas Jakubczyk, German sprinter and long jumper
  1985   – Deividas Stagniūnas, Lithuanian ice dancer
1986 – Roman Polák, Czech ice hockey player
  1986   – Jenna Ushkowitz, Korean-American actress, singer, and dancer
1987 – Ryan Conroy, Scottish footballer
  1987   – Daequan Cook, American basketball player
  1987   – Samantha Ruth Prabhu, Indian actress and model 
  1987   – Bradley Johnson, English footballer
  1987   – Zoran Tošić, Serbian footballer
1988 – Jonathan Biabiany, French footballer
  1988   – Juan Manuel Mata, Spanish footballer
  1988   – Katariina Tuohimaa, Finnish tennis player
1989 – Emil Salomonsson, Swedish footballer
  1989   – Kim Sung-kyu, South Korean singer
1990 – Niels-Peter Mørck, Danish footballer
1992 – Blake Bortles, American football player
  1992   – DeMarcus Lawrence, American football player
1993 – Craig Garvey, Australian rugby league player
  1993   – Eva Samková, Czech snowboarder
1995 – Jonathan Benteke, Belgian footballer
  1995   – Melanie Martinez, American singer
  1998 – Song Yu-bin, South Korean singer and actor

Deaths

Pre-1600
 224 – Artabanus IV of Parthia (b. 191)
 948 – Hu Jinsi, Chinese general and prefect
 988 – Adaldag, archbishop of Bremen
 992 – Jawhar as-Siqilli, Fatimid statesman
1109 – Abbot Hugh of Cluny (b. 1024)
1192 – Conrad of Montferrat (b. 1140)
1197 – Rhys ap Gruffydd, prince of Deheubarth (b. 1132)
1257 – Shajar al-Durr, sovereign sultana of Egypt
1260 – Luchesius Modestini, founding member of the Third Order of St. Francis
1400 – Baldus de Ubaldis, Italian jurist (b. 1327)
1489 – Henry Percy, 4th Earl of Northumberland, English politician (b. 1449)
1533 – Nicholas West, English bishop and diplomat (b. 1461)

1601–1900
1643 – Francisco de Lucena, Portuguese politician (b. 1578)
1710 – Thomas Betterton, English actor and manager (b. 1630)
1716 – Louis de Montfort, French priest and saint (b. 1673)
1726 – Thomas Pitt, English merchant and politician (b. 1653)
1741 – Magnus Julius De la Gardie, Swedish general and politician (b. 1668)
1772 – Johann Friedrich Struensee, German physician and politician (b. 1737)
1781 – Cornelius Harnett, American merchant, farmer, and politician (b. 1723)
1813 – Mikhail Kutuzov, Russian field marshal (b. 1745)
1816 – Johann Heinrich Abicht, German philosopher, author, and academic (b. 1762)
1841 – Peter Chanel, French priest, missionary, and martyr (b. 1803)
1853 – Ludwig Tieck, German author and poet (b. 1773)
1858 – Johannes Peter Müller, German physiologist and anatomist (b. 1801)
1865 – Samuel Cunard, Canadian-English businessman, founded Cunard Line (b. 1787)
1881 – Antoine Samuel Adam-Salomon, French sculptor and photographer (b. 1818)
1883 – John Russell, English hunter and dog breeder (b. 1795)

1901–present
1902 – Cyprien Tanguay, Canadian priest and historian (b. 1819)
1903 – Josiah Willard Gibbs, American scientist (b. 1839)
1905 – Fitzhugh Lee, American general and politician, 40th Governor of Virginia (b. 1835)
1925 – Richard Butler, English-Australian politician, 23rd Premier of South Australia (b. 1850)
1928 – May Jordan McConnel, Australian trade unionist and suffragist (b. 1860)
1929 – Hendrik van Heuckelum, Dutch footballer (b. 1879)
1936 – Fuad I of Egypt (b. 1868)
1939 – Anne Walter Fearn, American physician (b. 1867)
1944 – Mohammed Alim Khan, Manghud ruler (b. 1880)
  1944   – Frank Knox, American journalist and politician, 46th United States Secretary of the Navy (b. 1874)
1945 – Roberto Farinacci, Italian soldier and politician (b. 1892)
  1945   – Hermann Fegelein, German general (b. 1906)
  1945   – Benito Mussolini, Italian journalist and politician, 27th Prime Minister of Italy (b. 1883)
1946 – Louis Bachelier, French mathematician and academic (b. 1870)
1954 – Léon Jouhaux, French union leader, Nobel Prize laureate (b. 1879)
1956 – Fred Marriott, American race car driver (b. 1872)
1957 – Heinrich Bär, German colonel and pilot (b. 1913)
1962 – Bennie Osler, South African rugby player  (b. 1901)
1963 – Wilhelm Weber, German gymnast (b. 1880)
1970 – Ed Begley, American actor (b. 1901)
1973 – Clas Thunberg, Finnish speed skater (b. 1893)
1976 – Richard Hughes, American author and poet (b. 1900)
1977 – Ricardo Cortez, American actor (b. 1900)
  1977   – Sepp Herberger, German footballer and coach (b. 1897)
1978 – Mohammed Daoud Khan, Afghan commander and politician, 1st President of Afghanistan (b. 1909)
1980 – Tommy Caldwell, American bass player (b. 1949)
1987 – Ben Linder, American engineer and activist (b. 1959)
1989 – Esa Pakarinen, Finnish actor and musician (b. 1911)
1991 – Steve Broidy, American film producer (b. 1905)
1992 – Francis Bacon, Irish painter (b. 1909)
1993 – Diva Diniz Corrêa, Brazilian zoologist (b. 1918)
  1993   – Jim Valvano, American basketball player, coach, and sportscaster (b. 1946)
1994 – Berton Roueché, American journalist and author (b. 1910)
1996 – Lester Sumrall, American minister, founded LeSEA (b. 1913)
1997 – Ann Petry, American novelist (b. 1908)
1998 – Jerome Bixby, American author and screenwriter (b. 1923)
1999 – Rory Calhoun, American actor, producer, and screenwriter (b. 1922)
  1999   – Rolf Landauer, German-American physicist and engineer (b. 1927)
  1999   – Alf Ramsey, English footballer and manager (b. 1920)
  1999   – Arthur Leonard Schawlow, American physicist and academic, Nobel Prize laureate (b. 1921)
2000 – Jerzy Einhorn, Polish-Swedish physician and politician (b. 1925)
  2000   – Penelope Fitzgerald, English author and poet (b. 1916)
2002 – Alexander Lebed, Russian general and politician (b. 1950)
  2002   – Lou Thesz, American wrestler and trainer (b. 1916)
2005 – Percy Heath, American bassist (b. 1923)
  2005   – Chris Candido, American wrestler (b. 1971)
  2005   – Taraki Sivaram, Sri Lankan journalist and author (b. 1959)
2006 – Steve Howe, American baseball player (b. 1958)
2007 – Dabbs Greer, American actor (b. 1917)
  2007   – René Mailhot, Canadian journalist (b. 1942)
  2007   – Tommy Newsom, American saxophonist and bandleader (b. 1929)
  2007   – Carl Friedrich von Weizsäcker, German physicist and philosopher (b. 1912)
  2007   – Bertha Wilson, Scottish-Canadian lawyer and jurist (b. 1923)
2009 – Ekaterina Maximova, Russian ballerina and actress (b. 1939)
  2009   – Richard Pratt, Polish-Australian businessman (b. 1934)
2011 – Erhard Loretan, Swiss mountaineer (b. 1959)
2012 – Fred Allen, New Zealand rugby player and coach (b. 1920)
  2012   – Matilde Camus, Spanish poet and author (b. 1919)
  2012   – Al Ecuyer, American football player (b. 1937)
  2012   – Patricia Medina, English actress (b. 1919)
  2012   – Milan N. Popović, Serbian psychiatrist and author (b. 1924)
  2012   – Aberdeen Shikoyi, Kenyan rugby player (b. 1985)
2013 – Brad Lesley, American baseball player (b. 1958)
  2013   – Fredrick McKissack, American author (b. 1939)
  2013   – John C. Reynolds, American computer scientist and academic (b. 1935)
  2013   – Jack Shea, American director, producer, and screenwriter (b. 1928)
  2013   – János Starker, Hungarian-American cellist and educator (b. 1924)
  2013   – Paulo Vanzolini, Brazilian singer-songwriter and zoologist (b. 1924)
  2013   – Bernie Wood, New Zealand journalist and author (b. 1939)
2014 – Barbara Fiske Calhoun, American cartoonist and painter (b. 1919)
  2014   – William Honan, American journalist and author (b. 1930)
  2014   – Dennis Kamakahi, American guitarist and composer (b. 1953)
  2014   – Edgar Laprade, Canadian ice hockey player (b. 1919)
  2014   – Jack Ramsay, American basketball player, coach, and sportscaster (b. 1925)
  2014   – Idris Sardi, Indonesian violinist and composer (b. 1938)
  2014   – Frederic Schwartz, American architect, co-designed Empty Sky (b. 1951)
  2014   – Ryan Tandy, Australian rugby player (b. 1981)
2015 – Antônio Abujamra, Brazilian actor and director (b. 1932)
  2015   – Marcia Brown, American author and illustrator (b. 1918)
  2015   – Michael J. Ingelido, American general (b. 1916)
2016 – Jenny Diski, English author and screenwriter (b. 1947)
2017 – Mariano Gagnon, American Catholic priest and author (b. 1929)
2018 – James Hylton, American race car driver (b. 1934)
2019 – Richard Lugar, American politician (b.1932)
  2019   – John Singleton, American film director (b. 1968)
2021 – Michael Collins, American astronaut (b. 1930) 
  2021   – El Risitas, Spanish comedian (b. 1956)

Holidays and observances
Christian feast day:
Aphrodisius and companions
Gianna Beretta Molla
Kirill of Turov (Orthodox, added to Roman Martyrology in 1969)
Louis de Montfort
Pamphilus of Sulmona
Peter Chanel
Vitalis and Valeria of Milan
April 28 (Eastern Orthodox liturgics)
Mujahideen Victory Day (Afghanistan)
National Heroes Day (Barbados)
Restoration of Sovereignty Day (Japan)
Sardinia Day (Sardinia)
Workers' Memorial Day and World Day for Safety and Health at Work (international)
National Day of Mourning (Canada)

References

External links

 BBC: On This Day
 
 Historical Events on April 28

Days of the year
April